Tharpe is a surname that may refer to:

 Sister Rosetta Tharpe (1915–1973) gospel singer and guitarist
 Jimmy G. Tharpe (1930–2008), Baptist clergyman
 Larry Tharpe (born 1970), American football offensive tackle
 Saucerhead Tharpe, a major character in Glen Cook's Garrett P.I. series

See also
Tharp